SCG2, also called secretogranin II (chromogranin C), is a protein which in humans is encoded by the SCG2 gene.

Function 

The protein encoded by this gene is a member of the chromogranin/secretogranin family of neuroendocrine secretory proteins. Studies in rodents suggest that the full-length protein, secretogranin II, is involved in the packaging or sorting of peptide hormones and neuropeptides into secretory vesicles. The full-length protein is cleaved to produce the active peptide secretoneurin, which exerts chemotaxic effects on specific cell types, and EM66, whose function is unknown.

See also 
Chromogranin

Further reading

References